Searsia chirindensis is a medium-sized, semi-deciduous, trifoliate Southern African dioecious tree of up to 10 m tall, rarely 20 m, often multi-stemmed, occurring along the coastal belt from the Cape, through KwaZulu/Natal, Eswatini, Zimbabwe and Mozambique as far north as Tanzania, and growing in a wide variety of habitats such as open woodlands, in forests, along forest margins, in the open, among rocks and on mountain slopes. It was named by Swynnerton from a specimen collected by him near the Chirinda Forest in the Chipinge District of Southern Rhodesia. This is one of more than a hundred southern African species in the genus. It is commonly known as red currant because of a fancied resemblance of the fruit to that of the European redcurrant.

Traditional medicinal uses

Laboratory studies of bark extracts from this species show properties that may be useful in the treatment of convulsions and epilepsy, supporting its traditional use in ethnic medicine in some rural communities of South Africa.

References

External links

 Flora Zambesiaca

chirindensis